Nielsen Elias (born 19 June 1952) is a Brazilian former footballer who played as a goalkeeper. He competed in the men's tournament at the 1972 Summer Olympics.

References

1952 births
Living people
Footballers from Rio de Janeiro (city)
Brazilian footballers
Association football goalkeepers
Brazil international footballers
Olympic footballers of Brazil
Footballers at the 1972 Summer Olympics